Jo Sung-jin (Hangul: 조성진) (born November 2, 1979), better known by his stage name Skull (Hangul: 스컬) is a South Korean reggae singer, prior member of Stony Skunk and member of Skull & Haha. He is well known for his song "Love Inside" which became very popular in Jamaica.

Discography

Studio albums

Extended plays

Singles

References

External links 

 

1979 births
Living people
South Korean reggae singers
21st-century South Korean  male singers